Feet of Clay is a fantasy novel by British writer Terry Pratchett, the nineteenth book in the Discworld series, published in 1996. The story follows the members of the City Watch, as they attempt to solve murders apparently committed by a golem, as well as the unusual poisoning of the Patrician, Lord Vetinari.

The title is a figure of speech from Hebrew scripture (see feet of clay) and the script used in the book to represent Morporkian being written by a golem resembles the Hebrew alphabet, a reference to golems' origins in Jewish folklore.

Plot
Twelve of the city golems, clay creatures forced to obey the written instructions placed inside their heads, decide to create a "king" golem. They fashion a golem from their own clay and place in his head instructions that would fulfill their hopes: "Bring peace to the world", "Treat everyone fairly" and so on. They enroll the help of a priest and dwarf bread baker to write the sacred instructions and bake the clay, respectively; Meshugah, the "king" golem, is initially sent to work in a candle factory.

Around the same time, a cabal of Ankh-Morpork's nobles and guild leaders seeks to gradually depose the Patrician, replace him with Nobby Nobbs, revealed as the heir to the Earldom of Ankh, as the new king and rule the city through him.

To implement this, the cabal orders the golems' newly made king, Meshugah, to make poisoned candles and have them delivered to the palace. Vetinari is successfully poisoned, making him severely ill. Meshugah, however, is "overloaded" by all the different instructions his creators gave him, and goes "mad": he starts overworking and, when he exhausts raw materials, he rampages through the city, and goes on to murder the priest and baker who took part in his creation. The golems that made him are horrified as murder violates their most base instructions and Meshugah was baked from some of their parts and is therefore “clay of their clay.”

At this point the City Watch steps in trying to solve the murders and the poisoning of Lord Vetinari. With the assistance of their new forensics expert dwarf Cheery Littlebottom, Commander Vimes and Captain Carrot slowly unravel the mystery. The golems send one of their number, Dorfl, to falsely confess to the murders and the remaining eleven commit suicide.

Carrot and Dorfl, having been given a receipt for himself and thus owning himself and having no master, fight and defeat the golem king at the candle factory. Despite having his instructions removed, Dorfl is able to reveal that “words in the heart can not be taken” before dying, and is rebaked with a voice. Afterwards, Vimes confronts the city's chief heraldry expert, a vampire named Dragon King of Arms, who instigated the whole affair to ensure that the rightful heir to the Ankh-Morpork throne, Carrot, would not produce a part-werewolf line with Angua. Dorfl arrests him despite tenuous evidence and Vimes burns down all the heraldic record as retribution against the "elite" and "noble" plotters, who had happily and self-righteously sacrificed the lives of several "commoners" in the pursuit of their scheme (namely an elderly woman and a baby who lived in Cockbill Street, Vimes's childhood neighbourhood).

In the end, Vetinari has recovered completely, Dorfl is sworn in as a Watchman (much to the chagrin of Ankh-Morpork's theological establishment), Vimes gets a pay raise, and the Watch House gets a new dartboard. Vetinari reveals to his assistant, Drumknott, that he had known of the plot for some time already. Vimes' rash actions in the pursuit of truth had considerably scared the city elite, which is precisely why Vetinari had let him continue: so that the plotters would know just how much worse off they'd be if Vetinari died.

Characters

Carrot Ironfoundersson
Cheery Littlebottom
Angua von Überwald
Samuel Vimes
Dorfl
Dragon King of Arms
Meshugah

Reception
Publishers Weekly described the book as "fantasy served with a twist of Monty Python, parody that works by never taking itself too seriously", with "sly puns" and "lively, outrageous characters".  The A.V. Club, conversely, emphasized the book's "intelligent wit and wordplay with a notable lack of punnery", praised Pratchett for the "complexity" of the politics and the "three-dimensional" nature of the characters, and noted that the "sword and sorcery" plot "doesn't insult the reader's intelligence" despite involving "the bumbling City Watch" and "a murderous enchanted statue".

At the SF Site, Steven H Silver commended Pratchett for presenting "mysteries which can be solved with the clues provided", and stated that although the book does not have "quite as many laugh out loud moments as [previous Discworld novels]", it shows that Pratchett is "a novelist as well as a humorist".

Gideon Kibblewhite reviewed Feet of Clay for Arcane magazine, rating it a 9 out of 10 overall. Kibblewhite comments that "It's another gem from a master of comic fantasy."

References

External links

 
 Annotations for Feet of Clay
 Quotes from Feet of Clay
 Synopsis of Feet of Clay

1996 British novels
Discworld books
1996 fantasy novels
Golem
Fictional golems
Victor Gollancz Ltd books
British comedy novels